The Genesis Foundation for Children is a non-profit organization that provides funding for clinical, informational, and therapeutic programs for children born with genetic disorders and rare diseases in the New England area. Through fundraising events, individual donations and corporate sponsorships, The Genesis Foundation for Children has raised over $30 million for over 60,000 New England children and their families.

References

External links
 The Genesis Fund
 The Feingold Center for Children
 The Pregnancy Exposure InfoLine (PEIL)
 Therapy and the Performing Arts - Cape Cod
 The John Havlicek Celebrity Fishing Tournament
 On the Field at Fenway Park with Carl Yastrzemski

Disability organizations based in the United States
Organizations based in Massachusetts